Beyond Terror: The Truth About the Real Threats to Our World is a book by Chris Abbott, Paul Rogers and John Sloboda of Oxford Research Group, a UK-based think tank. It is a 120-page paperback published by the Rider imprint of Random House in April 2007.

Books about terrorism
2007 non-fiction books